St James the Great, or St James' Church, is a Grade II* listed church in Morpeth, Northumberland. The entrance screen which allows access to the churchyard from Newgate Street is also separately Grade II* listed. The church is still used for services and is currently part of the Anglican parish of Morpeth.

References

External links 

Morpeth, Northumberland
Church of England church buildings in Northumberland
Grade II* listed churches in Northumberland